George Nicholas Hatsopoulos (January 7, 1927 – September 20, 2018) was a Greek American mechanical engineer noted for his work in thermodynamics and for having co-founded Thermo Electron.

Early life
Hatsopoulos was born in Athens, Greece in 1927 and is related to the former rector of the Athens Polytechnic School, Nicolas Kitsikis. He attended Athens Polytechnic before entering MIT, where he received his Bachelor and Master of Science (1950), Mechanical Engineer (1954), and Doctorate of Science (1956).

Hatsopoulos-Keenan reformulation of thermodynamics

In 1965, he and Joseph Keenan published their textbook Principles of General Thermodynamics, which restates the second law of thermodynamics in terms of the existence of stable equilibrium states.  Their formulation of the second law of thermodynamics states that:

The Hatsopoulos-Keenan statement of the Second Law entails the Clausius, Kelvin-Planck, and Carathéodory statements of the Second Law, and has provided a basis to extend the traditional definition of entropy to the non-equilibrium domain.

In 1976, Hatsopoulos also contributed to a formulation of a unified theory of mechanics and thermodynamics, arguably a precursor of the emerging field of quantum thermodynamics.

Academic and industry leader
While at MIT, Hatsopoulos was head of the engineering division of Matrad Corporation of New York. Matrad Corporation and MIT also provided financial support for his doctoral thesis The Thermo-Electron Engine. Matrad Corporation was owned by the family of Peter M. Nomikos, a Harvard Business School graduate. In 1956, Nomikos and Hatsopoulos co-founded the Thermo Electron Corporation. Several years later, George asked his brother (John Hatsopoulos) to join the company as financial controller. Under George Hatsopoulos, Thermo Electron became a major provider of analytical instruments and services for a variety of domains. John Hatsopoulos, and Arvin Smith. In 1965, George Hatsopoulos was president of the Thermo Electron Engineering Corporation and Senior Lecturer in Mechanical Engineering at M.I.T.

Recognition
In 1961, Hatsopoulos received the Golden Plate Award of the American Academy of Achievement. In 1996, Hatsopoulos won the John Fritz Medal, which is the highest American award in the engineering profession and presented each year for scientific or industrial achievement in any field of pure or applied science. In 1997, he was awarded the 3rd Annual Heinz Award in Technology, the Economy and Employment.

In 2011, along with Arvin Smith and John Hatsopoulos, he was awarded the 2011 Pittcon Heritage Award from the Chemical Heritage Foundation.

Hatsopoulos is also a recipient of The International Center in New York's Award of Excellence.

He died on September 20, 2018, at the age of 91. His net worth was reported as US$481 million in 2017.

See also
History of thermodynamics

References

External links
George Hatsopoulos - Biography
George Hatsopoulos - National Academy of Engineering, chairman and CEO

1927 births
2018 deaths
Thermodynamicists
American people of Greek descent
MIT School of Engineering faculty
American mechanical engineers
American manufacturing businesspeople
Members of the United States National Academy of Engineering
Kitsikis family
People from Athens
Henry Laurence Gantt Medal recipients